Amirnan (also Romanized as Amīrnān; also known as Amīrnāl) is a village in Pain Taleqan Rural District, in the Central District of Taleqan County, Alborz Province, Iran. At the 2006 census, its population was 215, in 77 families.

References 

Populated places in Taleqan County